The left anterior descending artery (also LAD, anterior interventricular branch of left coronary artery, or anterior descending branch) is a branch of the left coronary artery. It supplies the anterior portion of the left ventricle. It provides about half of the arterial supply to the left ventricle and is thus considered the most important vessel supplying the left ventricle. Blockage of this artery is often called the widow-maker infarction due to a high risk of death.

Structure

Course 
It first passes at posterior to the pulmonary artery, then passes anteriorward between that pulmonary artery and the left atrium to reach the anterior interventricular sulcus, along which it descends to the notch of cardiac apex.In 78% of cases, it reaches the apex of the heart.

Although rare, multiple anomalous courses of the LAD have been described. These include the origin of the artery from the right aortic sinus.

Branches
The LAD gives off two types of branches: septals and diagonals.  
 Septals originate from the LAD at 90 degrees to the surface of the heart, perforating and supplying the anterior 2/3 of the interventricular septum. 
 Diagonals run along the surface of the heart and supply the lateral wall of the left ventricle and the anterolateral papillary muscle.

Segments
 Proximal: from LAD origin to, and including, the origin of the first septal branch (some definitions say to first diagonal, or to whichever comes first)
 Middle: from proximal segment to halfway of remaining distance to apex. A more technical definition is from the proximal segment to the point where the LAD forms an angle, as seen from a right anterior oblique view on angiography, which is often close to the origin of the second diagonal branch.
 Distal: from middle segment to apex, or in some cases beyond.

Function
The artery supplies the anterior region of the left ventricle, including: the anterolateral myocardium, apex, anterior interventricular septum, and anterolateral papillary muscle. The LAD typically supplies 45–55% of the left ventricle and is therefore considered the most critical vessel in terms of myocardial blood supply.

Widow maker

Widow maker is an alternative name for the anterior interventricular branch of the left coronary artery. The name widow maker may also apply to the left coronary artery or severe occlusions to that artery.

This term is used because the left main coronary and/or the left anterior descending supply blood to large areas of the heart. This means that if these arteries are abruptly and completely occluded it will cause a massive heart attack that will likely lead to sudden death. The blockage that kills is made up of platelets streaming to the site of a ruptured cholesterol plaque. Even a small amount of plaque in this area can (for a variety of poorly understood reasons) rupture and cause death; bypassing chronic blockages or trying to open them up with angioplasty does not prevent heart attack but it can restore blood flow in case of a sudden blockage or heart attack and if performed within a rapid time period can minimize the damage done. An example of the devastating results of a complete occlusion of the LAD artery was the sudden death of former NBC News Washington Bureau Chief Tim Russert, as well as the near-death of film director Kevin Smith.

From the minute a widow maker heart attack hits, survival time ranges from minutes to several hours. Rapidly progressing symptoms should signal the need for immediate attention. Symptoms of initial onset may include nausea, shortness of breath, pain in the head, jaw, arms or chest, numbness in fingers, often of a novel but imprecise sensation which builds with irregular heart beat. Early symptoms may be mistaken for food poisoning, flu or general malaise until they intensify. A widow maker cannot kill instantly but induces cardiac arrest which may do so within 10 to 20 minutes of no circulation. A victim with no pulse or breath is still alive, living off oxygen stored in the blood and may be able to be rescued if treatment is begun promptly within this window.

Additional images

References

External links
  - "Heart: The Left Coronary Artery and its Branches"
  - "Anterior view of the heart."

Arteries of the thorax